So Fresh: The Hits of Autumn 2001 is a compilation album featuring songs from various artists in all genres. The songs were picked from some of the most popular during the autumn of 2001 in Australia.

Track listing
 Destiny's Child – "Independent Women" (3:41)
 Mýa – "Case of the Ex" (3:53)
 Ricky Martin – "She Bangs" (4:04)
 Human Nature – "He Don't Love You" (3:12)
 Vanessa Amorosi – "The Power" (3:26)
 U2 – "Beautiful Day" (4:07)
 3 Doors Down – "Kryptonite" (3:56)
 Samantha Mumba – "Body II Body" (3:59)
 Pink – "Most Girls" (5:01)
 Kandi – "Don't Think I'm Not" (3:52)
 Nelly – "Country Grammar (Hot Shit)" (3:53)
 soulDecision – "Faded" (3:30)
 Westlife – "My Love" (3:53)
 Sonique – "Sky" (4:03)
 98 Degrees – "Give Me Just One Night (Una Noche)" (3:26)
 Ronan Keating – "The Way You Make Me Feel" (3:40)
 Joanne – "Busted" (3:15)
 Anastacia – "Not That Kind" (3:22)
 You Am I – "Damage" (3:29)
 Public Domain – "Operation Blade (Bass in the Place)" (3:06)

Charts

References 

So Fresh albums
2001 compilation albums
2001 in Australian music